The 1901 Calgary municipal election was held on December 9, 1901 to elect a mayor and nine aldermen to sit on the eighteenth Calgary City Council from January 6, 1902 to January 5, 1903.

Background
Voting rights were provided to any male, single woman, or widowed British subject over twenty-one years of age who are assessed on the last revised assessment roll with a minimum property value of $200.

The election was held under multiple non-transferable vote where each elector was able to cast a ballot for the mayor and up to three ballots for separate councillors with a voter's designated ward.

Key issues for the election included the levying of a municipal income tax recently provided by changes to the City Charter. The Calgary Daily Herald speculated that John Emerson's loss of council seat was attributed to the public's association of his name with the income tax, when he merely read the resolution proposed by the City Clerk.

Results

Mayor
Thomas Underwood

Councillors

Ward 1

Ward 2
John Creighton - Acclaimed
William Henry Cushing - Acclaimed
John Jackson Young - Acclaimed

Ward 3

September 1902 by-election
Following John Creighton's death on July 29, 1902, the City of Calgary scheduled a by-election for the vacant seat in Ward 2 for September 8, 1902, however John Hamilton Kerr would be acclaimed upon the close of nominations on September 1, 1902.

See also
List of Calgary municipal elections

References

Municipal elections in Calgary
1901 elections in Canada
1900s in Calgary